IruSoft (Arabic: آيروسوفت) is an insurance regulatory platform designated for licensing, supervision and inspection of the insurance sector within a country. The platform introduced unique supervision-technology (suptech), insurance-technology (insurtech) and regulatory-technology (regtech) automated modules by which a regulator requires less resources to ensure fairness, transparency and competition and to prevent conflicts of interest in the sector. IruSoft was founded by Abdullah Al-Salloum and owned by the Insurance Regulatory Unit in Kuwait.

The Insurance Regulatory Unit optimized processing insurance-sector's customer complaints by issuing Resolution No. (1) of 2022 that introduced IruSoft's complaints public module; an automated resolution center, by which the process of receiving submitted complaints, passing them on to the platforms of licensed insurance companies, tracking matter-related discussions and updates and getting them escalated if unresolved to be discussed by a committee assigned by the unit is integrally automated and analyzed for better key performance indicators.

External links 
 IruSoft Comprehensive Developer Manual
 Insurance Regulatory Unit Official website
 Resolution No. (1) of 2022

References 

Application software